Ancient Land is the twelfth studio album and eleventh home video release by the group Celtic Woman.

Background 
The album was recorded at Real World Studios, Herbert Place Studios, Beechpark Studios, and Jam Studios in London, United Kingdom in July 2018. The digital album was released on 28 September 2018 and the CD was released on 26 October 2018, with a digital deluxe edition following on 6 September 2019.

The album is produced, arranged, and orchestrated by Gavin Murphy and includes a mixture of traditional Irish songs and contemporary arrangements. The lead performers are vocalists Mairéad Carlin, Éabha McMahon, and Megan Walsh as well as instrumentalist Tara McNeill. Ancient Land was Walsh's studio debut and live debut with the group.

An accompanying concert special of the same title was recorded live outside of Johnstown Castle in County Wexford, Ireland on 13 and 14 September 2018 in front of an invited audience. It was the group's first outdoor special since Songs from the Heart was recorded nine years prior. The special began airing on PBS in November 2018, and was released on DVD and Blu-ray on 25 January 2019.

Both the album and concert special were both dedicated to Dave Kavanagh, one of the founders of Celtic Woman, who died on 6 April 2018, and was, according to the group, "our founder, our leader, our guiding light. Sé mo laoch mo ghile mear."

Track listing 

Notes
 Tracks 17 and 18 were not available on the digital album, only on the physical CD and digital deluxe edition.
 Tracks 1, 4, 6, 15, 17 and 18 were original tracks written by Gavin Murphy.
 Tracks 4 and 18 were co-written by Méav Ní Mhaolchatha.
 Track 14 was written by Éabha McMahon and Ciarán Byrne.
 Track 15 was co-written by Johnny B. Broderick.

Personnel 
Per the liner notes:

Celtic Woman

 Mairéad Carlin – vocals
 Éabha McMahon – vocals, tin whistle
 Tara McNeill – fiddle, harp
 Megan Walsh – vocals
Musicians

 Bill Shanley – guitars
 James Blennerhassett – bass guitar, double bass
 Paul Clarvis – drums, percussion
 Noel Eccles – percussion
 Liam Bradley – drums
 Alex Vann – mandolin bouzouki
 John O'Brien – uilleann pipes, whistles
 Darragh Murphy – uilleann pipes, whistles
 Cormac DeBarra – Irish harp
 Peter Browne – accordion
 Declan Aungier – accordion
 Anthony Byrne – bagpipes
 Glenn Murphy – background vocals
 Ronan Scolard – background vocals
 Simon Morgan – background vocals
 Paul McGough – background vocals
 Daryn Crosbie – tap dancer
 Alan McGrath – tap dancer
 Gerald Peregrine – solo cello
 Gavin Murphy – piano, keyboards, programming, string arrangements

The Orchestra of Ireland

 Joe Csibi – orchestra contractor
 Ken Rice – leader
 Lynda O'Connor – violin
 Lydia J. Clarke – violin
 Anita Vedres – violin
 Cillian Brackin – violin
 Sylvia Roberts – violin
 Jane Hackett – violin
 Emily Thyne – violin
 Aoife Durnin – violin
 Aoife Dowdall – violin
 Paul O'Hanlon – violin
 Rachel Grimes – violin
 Leanne Melchoir – viola
 Adele Johnson – viola
 Karen Dervan – viola
 Carla Vedres – viola
 Anthony Mulholland – viola
 Gerald Peregrine – cello
 Martin Johnson – cello
 Una Ni Chanainn – cello
 Jane Huges – cello
 Anna Marcossi – cello

Charts

References 

Celtic Woman albums
2018 live albums
2018 video albums
Manhattan Records albums